is a town located in Sorachi Subprefecture, Hokkaido, Japan.

As of September 2016, the town has an estimated population of 3,207. The total area is 283.21 km2. Numata's twin city is Port Hardy, Canada.

Culture

Mascots

They are snowflake fairies. Pikazo is a blue male snowflake fairy while Sunon-chan is a pink female snowflake fairy.

References

External links
Official Website 

Towns in Hokkaido